"The Water Is Wide" (also called "O Waly, Waly" or simply "Waly, Waly") is a folk song of Scottish origin. It remains popular in the 21st century. Cecil Sharp published the song in Folk Songs From Somerset (1906).

Themes and construction 
The imagery of the lyrics describes the challenges of love: "Love is handsome, love is kind" during the novel honeymoon phase of any relationship. However, as time progresses, "love grows old, and waxes cold." Even true love, the lyrics say, can "fade away like morning dew."

The modern lyric for "The Water Is Wide" was consolidated and named by Cecil Sharp in 1906 from multiple older sources in southern England, following English lyrics with very different stories and styles but the same meter. Earlier sources were frequently published as broadsheets without music. Performers or publishers would insert, remove, and adapt verses from one piece to another: floating verses are also characteristic of hymns and blues verses. Lyrics from different sources could be used with different melodies of the same metre. Consequently, each verse in the modern song may not have been originally composed in the context of its surrounding verses nor be consistent in theme.

Variants
"The Water is Wide" may be considered a family of lyrics with a particular hymn-like tune.

"O Waly Waly" (Wail, Wail) may be sometimes a particular lyric, sometimes a family tree of lyrics, sometimes "Jamie Douglas", sometimes one melody or another with the correct meter, and sometimes versions of the modern compilation "The Water is Wide" (usually with the addition of the verse starting "O Waly, Waly"). Benjamin Britten used the melody and verses of "The Water is Wide" for his arrangement — which does not have the "O Waly, Waly" verse, yet is titled "Waly, Waly". A different melody is used for the song, "When Cockleshells turn Silver Bells" also subtitled "Waly, Waly". Yet another melody for "O Waly, Waly" is associated with the song, "Jamie Douglas" lyric.

Ancestors
A key ancestor is the lyric "Waly, Waly, Gin Love Be Bonny" from Ramsay's "Tea Table Miscellany" (1724), given below. This is a jumble of verses from other lyrics including "Arthur's Seat shall be my Bed" (1701), "The Distressed Virgin" (1633) and the Scottish scandal ballad "Jamie Douglas" (1776).

The use of 'cockleshells' and 'silver bells' in Thomson's version (1725) pre-dates the earliest published "Mary, Mary, Quite Contrary" (1744) and may relate to torture.

Some though not all versions of "Jamie Douglas" have the first verse that starts "O, Waly, Waly". Andrew Lang found a variant verse in Ramsay's "Tea Table Miscellany" from a sixteenth-century song.

Cousins
Predecessors of "The Water is Wide" also influenced lyrics for other folk and popular songs, such as the modern version of the Irish "Carrickfergus" (1960s) and the American "Sweet Peggy Gordan"  (1880). The Irish folk song "Carrickfergus" shares the lines 'but the sea is wide/I cannot swim over/And neither have I wings to fly'.  This song may be preceded by an Irish language song whose first line  ("It was a noble woman") matches closely the opening line of one known variation of Lord Jamie Douglas: 'I was a lady of renown'.  However, the content of the English-language "Carrickfergus" includes material clearly from the Scots/English songs not in any known copy of  suggesting considerable interplay among all known traditions. The Welsh version is called "".

It is related to Child Ballad 204 (Roud number 87), "Jamie Douglas", which in turn refers to the ostensibly unhappy first marriage of James Douglas, 2nd Marquis of Douglas to Lady Barbara Erskine.

Descendants
The modern "The Water Is Wide" was popularized by Pete Seeger in the folk revival. There have been multiple subsequent variations of the song and several names — including "Waly, Waly", "There is a Ship", and "Cockleshells" — which use and re-use different selections of lyrics. The song "Van Diemen's Land" on the album Rattle and Hum by U2 uses a variation of the melody of "The Water Is Wide".

The song "When the Pipers Play," sung by Isla St. Clair on the video of the same name, uses the melody of "The Water is Wide".

Graeme Allwright translated the song into French. It was recorded in Breton language by Tri Yann as "Divent an dour". In 1991, the French singer Renaud recorded it as "" (The Ballad of Northern Ireland). At the Dunkerque carnival, people sing "" based on the same melody.

Neil Young's "Mother Earth (Natural Anthem)" uses the melody of "The Water is Wide".

Lyrics

Waly, Waly, Gin Love Be Bonny 

The lyrics for "Waly, Waly, Gin Love Be Bonny" from Ramsay's Tea Table Miscellany (1724).
.

The Water Is Wide 
Some popular lyrics for "The Water is Wide" are within the book Folk Songs For Solo Singers, though many versions have been printed and sung.

The water is wide, I cannot get over 
Neither have I wings to fly 
Give me a boat that can carry two 
And both shall row, my love and I

A ship there is and she sails the sea 
She's loaded deep as deep can be 
But not so deep as the love I'm in 
I know not if I sink or swim

I leaned my back against an oak 
Thinking it was a trusty tree 
But first it bent and then it broke 
So did my love prove false to me

I reached my finger into some soft bush 
Thinking the fairest flower to find 
I pricked my finger to the bone 
And left the fairest flower behind

Oh love be handsome and love be kind 
Gay as a jewel when first it is new 
But love grows old and waxes cold 
And fades away like the morning dew

Must I go bound while you go free 
Must I love a man who doesn't love me 
Must I be born with so little art 
As to love a man who'll break my heart

When cockle shells turn silver bells 
Then will my love come back to me 
When roses bloom in winter's gloom 
Then will my love return to me

Jürgen Klos traces the first verse to "I'm Often Drunk And Seldom Sober" (c. 1780), the second to "The Seamans leave taken of his sweetest Margery" (c. 1660), the third to "Oh Waly, Waly, Gin Love Be Bonny" (already 'old' when published in c. 1724), and the fourth to "Hey trollie lollie, love is jolly"  (c. 1620.) He could not trace the melody before 1905.

Round
<poem>
The Water is Wide
I Cannot get over
Nor have I Wings
With which to-o-o fly
O-o-h give me a boat
That can carry Two
We both shall Row
My friend and I-i-I</poem>
(repeat twice in parts with one part higher than the other and then sing in round with group two beginning to sing at the word 'Nor')

Another version
The water is wide 
I cannot get o'er
No wings have I 
No wings have I to-o fly
Give me a boat
That will carry two
We both shall row,
my friend and I.

Verse 2:
As I look out
across the sea
a Bright horizon beckons me
And I am called to do my best
and be the most
that I can be.

Another version, from Australia

The Voyage Home

The water is wide, I cannot get o'er
And neither have I wings to fly,
Build me a boat that can carry two
And both shall row, my love and I.

I leaned my back up against an oak,
To find it was a trusty tree,
I found you true, love, when first you spoke,
'tis true you are, and ever shall be.

Our love shines clearly against the storm,
Turns darkest night to brightest day,
Turns turbulent waters to perfect calm,
A blazing lamp to light our way.

Love is the centre of all we see,
Love is the jewel that guides us true,
No matter what, love, you'll stay with me,
No matter what, my love, I'll stay with you.

The water is wide, I cannot get o'er
And neither have I wings to fly,
Build me a boat that can carry two
And both shall row, my love and I.

Another version, from Canada
The water is wide, I cannot cross o'er,
And neither have I the wings to fly.
Build me a boat that can carry two
And both shall row, my true love and I.

A ship there is and she sails the sea
She's laden deep, as deep can be.
But not so deep as the love I'm in,
And I know not if I sink or swim.

I leaned my back against a young oak,
Thinking 'twere a trusty tree.
But first it bent and then it broke,
Thus did my love prove false to me.

O love is handsome and love is kind,
Bright as a jewel when first it's new
But love grows old and waxes cold,
And fades away like the morning dew,
And fades away like the morning dew.

 Recent renditions 
 Arrangements 
"O Waly, Waly" has been a popular choice for arrangements by classical composers, in particular Benjamin Britten, whose arrangement for voice and piano was published in 1948. John Rutter uses it for the Third Movement in his "Suite for Strings" (1973).

The tune is often used for the hymn "When I Survey the Wondrous Cross" by Isaac Watts. It is also the tune for John Bell's "When God Almighty came to Earth" (1987) and F. Pratt Green's "An Upper Room did our Lord Prepare" (1974). Additionally, Hal H. Hopson used the tune for his work "The Gift of Love". Hopson also wrote Christian lyrics to "The Water is Wide", which are often performed by church choirs.

Because the melody is consistent with the words of Adon Olam, a prayer closing most modern Jewish services, Susan Colin performed a version with an also-revised prayer. One congregation's choir performed it with the standard Hebrew prayer. One instrumental version is consistent with the stanzas of the prayer.

Oregon has a jazz version of this on their 30th studio album, Lantern.

 Recordings 
The song has been recorded by multiple artists. Esther & Abi Ofarim recorded "Oh Waly Waly" in 1963 for their album Songs Der Welt, and for their live concert album in 1969. Esther re-released the song on box-set CD  in 1999.

 In popular culture 
 Television 
The CBS TV series The Unit featured an episode in season 2 titled "The Water is Wide", in which Unit members must disarm a bomb in the office of the Secretary-General of the UN, while their wives seek an alleged POW/MIA soldier in Vietnam.

 Films 
 Gerard Way covered the song for Kevin Smith's film Tusk.
 PJ Harvey recorded this song in 2014 for the second season of BBC Two's Peaky Blinders.
 Performed by John Rutter and the Cambridge Singers, the song features in Isobel Waller-Bridge's score for the 2020 film Emma''.

References

External links

Recording by May Ip (in oggvorbis format) from a session in Wales in 1993, made available in the free downloads of May Ip's personal website.
Sample lyrics and MIDI
Recording of "The Water Is Wide" by the Beers Family at the 1963 Florida Folk Festival (made available for public by the State Archives of Florida)
 Lyrics and some information
 The Water is Wide (traditional, UK/USA; circa 1724) (video) – about history of the song
 Mirror (2010) sample

17th-century songs
Bob Dylan songs
Barbra Streisand songs
Gerard Way songs
Peter, Paul and Mary songs
English folk songs
Scottish folk songs
Northumbrian folklore
Eva Cassidy songs
Year of song unknown
Songwriter unknown
Child Ballads
Esther & Abi Ofarim songs